The 1907 Hornsey by-election was held on 5 June 1907.  The by-election was held due to the resignation of the incumbent Conservative MP, Charles Balfour.  It was won by the Conservative candidate Lawrence Dundas, who was unopposed.

References

Political history of Middlesex
Hornsey,1907
Hornsey by-election
Hornsey by-election
20th century in Middlesex
Hornsey,1907
Hornsey
Unopposed by-elections to the Parliament of the United Kingdom (need citation)